Skeeter may refer to:

 North American slang for mosquito, an insect

Arts and entertainment

Fictional characters
 Skeeter (Marvel comics), a nickname for Titania
 Skeeter (Muppet), in Muppet Babies
 Skeeter (South Park), in South Park
 one of the title characters of Muggs and Skeeter, an American daily comic strip (1927–1974)
 Skeeter, a recurring Saturday Night Live character
 Skeeter, nickname of Naomi Oates Harper, in Mama's Family
 Skeeter, in Cousin Skeeter
 Skeeter the Paperboy, on-screen persona of Australian TV host James Kemsley
 Skeeter Bronson, in the movie Bedtime Stories
 Skeeter Valentine, in Doug
 Eugenia "Skeeter" Phelan, in the novel and film The Help
 Rita Skeeter, in the Harry Potter series

Film
 Skeeter (film), a 1993 horror film

People

Music
 Skeeter Best (1914–1985), American jazz guitarist
 Skeeter Brandon (1948–2008), American blues musician
 Skeeter Bonn (1923–1994), American singer and guitarist
 Skeeter Davis (1931–2004), American singer
 Skeeter Thompson, American punk bassist 
 Yung Skeeter, American DJ and recording artist Trevor McFedries (born 1985)

Sports
 Skeeter Barnes (born 1957), American Major League Baseball player
 Carson Bigbee (1895–1964), American Major League Baseball player
 Kevin Coghlan (footballer) (1929-2002), Australian rules footballer
 Fred Fleiter (1897–1973), Australian rules footballer
 Skeeter Henry (born 1967), American professional basketball player
 Summerfield Johnston III (1954–2007), American businessman and polo player
 Skeeter Kell (1929–2015), American Major League Baseball player
 Skeeter Newsome (1910–1989), American Major League Baseball player
 Skeeter Scalzi (1913–1984), American professional baseball player
 Skeeter Shelton (1888–1954), American collegiate baseball player
 Skeeter Swift (born 1946), American professional basketball player
 Skeeter Werner Walker (1933–2001), American alpine skier
 Skeeter Webb (1909–1986), American Major League Baseball player
 Clyde Wright (born 1941), American Major League Baseball player

Other fields
 Skeeter Reece, (1950/1951–), American clown
 Skeeter Skelton (1928–1988), American lawman and writer
 Skeeter Thurston, an American-Canadian rodeo cowboy

Sports teams
 Jersey City Skeeters (1885–1933), an American minor league baseball team
 Newark Skeeters, an American 1920s soccer club 
 Rochester Skeeters (1998–2001), an American basketball club
 Sugar Land Skeeters, an American baseball team

Aircraft
 Composite Engineering BQM-167 Skeeter, an aerial target drone
 Curtiss-Robertson CR-1 Skeeter, an American 1930s light sports aircraft 
 Fisher FP-505 Skeeter, a Canadian kit aircraft
 Saunders-Roe Skeeter, a 1950s–1960s British light helicopter
 Sheffield Skeeter X-1, an American homebuilt aircraft

See also

 Skeets (disambiguation)
 Skeet (disambiguation)

Lists of people by nickname